The UNCAF Nations Cup 2009 was the tenth edition of the UNCAF Nations Cup, the biennial football (soccer) tournament for the CONCACAF-affiliated national teams of Central America. The first five places qualified for the 2009 CONCACAF Gold Cup. The event was going to take place in Panama City, Panama between January 22 and February 1, 2009, but the Panamanian FA announced that they would not host the event due to not having an adequate stadium available for the time period of the tournament. The alternative hosts were Honduras and Guatemala. Honduras submitted an official replacement bid on November 12, and after some consideration it was moved to Honduras. All games were played in Estadio Tiburcio Carías Andino in Tegucigalpa. The tournament was sponsored by Digicel. On 1 February 2009 Panama won the tournament, the first UNCAF Nations Cup win in the country's history.

Participating nations
All seven UNCAF members participated in the tournament:

Squads

Stadium

First round
The group stage draw took place on December 9, 2008 in Guatemala City. The reigning champions, Costa Rica, and the hosts, Honduras, were automatically drawn as top seed in their respective groups. Costa Rica was paired with Panama and Guatemala, the first two runners-up from the UNCAF Nations Cup 2007. The remaining teams – El Salvador, Nicaragua, and Belize – were drawn into the same group as Honduras.

Group A

Group B

Final round

Fifth place
The winner of the fifth place match qualified for the 2009 CONCACAF Gold Cup as the fifth and final entrant from Central America.

Semifinals
All four semifinalists qualified for the 2009 CONCACAF Gold Cup.

 The game was called after sixty minutes of play when El Salvador was reduced to six players. Two El Salvador players, Alexander Escobar and Eliseo Quintanilla, were awarded red cards in the first half, and Deris Umanzor, Rodolfo Zelaya, and goalkeeper Juan José Gómez were injured and had to leave the game after El Salvador had already exhausted their three substitutions. The game was awarded 3–0 to Costa Rica

Third place

Final

Results

 Top 5 qualified to the 2009 CONCACAF Gold Cup.

Scorers
3 goals
 Andy Furtado

2 goals

 Alfredo Pacheco
 Samuel Wilson
 Walter Martínez

1 goal

 Alberto Zapata
 Ricardo Phillips
 Lisbey Castillo
 Jerome James
 Harrison Róchez
 William Sunsing
 Roberto Segura
 Álvaro Sánchez
 Pablo Herrera
 Marlon Medina
 Armando Reyes
 Juan Barrera
 Marvin Chávez
 Mario Rodríguez
 Saúl Martínez
 Carlos Pavón
 Emil Martínez
 Amado Guevara
 Roger Espinoza
 Minor López
 Ramón Sánchez
 Carlos Ayala

1 goal (Own Goal)

 Silvio Avilés (for El Salvador)
 David Solorzano (for Honduras)

See also

 UNCAF Nations Cup
 2009 CONCACAF Gold Cup
 Central American Football Union

References

External links
 2009 CONCACAF Gold Cup at CONCACAF.com

 
2009 in Central American football

2009
2009
2008–09 in Salvadoran football
2008–09 in Costa Rican football
2008–09 in Honduran football
2008–09 in Guatemalan football
2008–09 in Nicaraguan football
2008–09 in Panamanian football
2008–09 in Belizean football